Alfred Nieman (1914 – 7 March 1997) was a British pianist and composer.

Born in the East End of London in 1914 to Polish immigrant parents, Alfred Nieman was playing piano for the silent cinema by the age of fourteen.  His talent as a pianist was spotted and the result was that he won a piano scholarship to the Royal Academy of Music.  In the 1930s he edited a six penny magazine "The Student".

Before World War II, he had a very successful piano duo with his contemporary Cimbro Martin called "Merlin and Martyn".  During the war the duo replaced Rawicz and Landauer at their engagements when this much admired duo was interned.  While their success was interrupted by the war, and, as conscientious objectors the duo became firemen throughout the London Blitz, Merlin and Martyn was a regular act at The Dorchester Hotel in London.

After the war he picked up the threads of his career by becoming a BBC "house" pianist and was assigned tasks which required him on one occasion to accompany Noël Coward and on another to stand in for the soloist and broadcast a piano concerto at very short notice.

Alfred composed extensively and across the whole spectrum of musical idioms, protecting the then perceived respectability of his reputation as a serious composer by writing under at least six pseudonyms.  He ghost wrote music on occasions including some film music which was credited to Benjamin Britten.

He married in 1938 and with new family responsibilities (sons Julian, born 1946, and Paul, born 1950) he took up a professorship (1947) for piano and composition at the Guildhall School of Music where he introduced and pioneered the use of improvisation, largely atonal, as a means of teaching composition.  This was revolutionary for its time and the GSM was the only place where such a teaching idea could be found.  He remained loyal to the Guildhall School of Music until his retirement.

He also gave evening classes in improvisation notably at Chiswick and Hampstead. Those who attended his classes included Sam Richards, Barry Guy, Paul Rutherford, Fred Turner, Frank Denyer, Louis Foreman, Fiachre Trench and many others.

His interests involved him with music therapy, The Society for Gifted Children, Research Into Lost Knowledge Organisation and The Society for Psychic & Psychological Research.

Alfred Nieman died in Hampstead, London on 7 March 1997.

Works

Sources
 www.alfrednieman.co.uk further information
 http://britishmusiccollection.org.uk/composer/alfred-nieman

Notes

1914 births
1997 deaths
British classical pianists
Male classical pianists
Classical piano duos
20th-century classical pianists
20th-century British composers
20th-century British male musicians